Yusuf Zuayyin (‎; 25 January 1931 – 10 January 2016) was a Syrian politician. A member of the Ba'ath Party, he served as Prime Minister of Syria in 1965 and again from 1966 to 1968. He was born in Abu Kamal. 

Zuayyin died after a long illness on 10 January 2016 in Stockholm, Sweden. He was 84.

References

1931 births
2016 deaths
Members of the Regional Command of the Arab Socialist Ba'ath Party – Syria Region
Prime Ministers of Syria